The 1837 Rhode Island gubernatorial election was held on April 19, 1837.

Incumbent Democratic Governor John Brown Francis won re-election to a fifth term, defeating Constitutional Party candidate William Peckham.

General election

Candidates
John Brown Francis, Democratic, incumbent Governor
William Peckham, of South Kingstown, Constitutional, National Republican and Whig presidential elector in 1832 and 1836

Results

Notes

References

1837
Rhode Island
Gubernatorial